Sofia Bertizzolo (born 21 August 1997) is an Italian professional racing cyclist, who currently rides for UCI Women's WorldTeam UEA Team ADQ

Major results

2014
 UEC Junior Road European Championships
1st  Road race
6th Time trial
 National Junior Road Championships
1st  Road race
2nd Time trial
2015
 1st Trofeo Da Moreno - Piccolo Trofeo Alfredo Binda
 2nd Road race, National Junior Road Championships
 9th Road race, UEC Junior Road Championships
2016
 4th GP della Liberazione
 7th Overall Giro Toscana Int. Femminile - Memorial Michela Fanini 
2017
 4th Gran Premio Bruno Beghelli Internazionale Donne Elite
 5th Overall Vuelta Internacional Femenina a Costa Rica
 7th Road race, National Road Championships
 8th Giro dell'Emilia Internazionale Donne Elite
2018
 1st  Youth classification UCI Women's World Tour
 1st  Overall Giro delle Marche in Rosa
 1st  Young rider classification Giro Rosa
 1st  Mountains classification Festival Elsy Jacobs
 2nd Road race, National Road Championships
 4th Winston Salem Cycling Classic
 7th Overall Giro Toscana Int. Femminile - Memorial Michela Fanini
1st  Mountains classification 
 8th La Flèche Wallonne Féminine
2019
 4th Tour of Flanders
 9th Road race, National Road Championships
2020
 5th Three Days of Bruges–De Panne
2021
 1st La Classique Morbihan
 4th GP de Plouay
 8th Trofeo Alfredo Binda
 10th La Course by Le Tour de France
2022
 1st Trofeo Oro in Euro–Women's Bike Race
 2nd Trofeo Alfredo Binda
 5th Overall Grand Prix Elsy Jacobs
 9th Brabantse Pijl
 10th Amstel Gold Race

See also
 List of 2016 UCI Women's Teams and riders

References

External links
 

1997 births
Living people
Italian female cyclists
People from Bassano del Grappa
Cyclists of Fiamme Oro
Cyclists from the Province of Vicenza